Pssst! (styled as pssst!) was a short-lived British comics magazine published by Never–Artpool in 1982. Pssst!, which lasted ten monthly issues, was an attempt to publish a British equivalent of the lavish French bande dessinée magazines.

Bryan Talbot, Glenn Dakin, Shaky Kane, Paul Johnson, Stephen Baskerville, Ed Pinsent, John Watkiss, John Bolton, John Higgins, and Angus McKie were amongst the many cartoonists published within the pages of pssst!. Early parts of Talbot's The Adventures of Luther Arkwright were published in the comic. 

Talbot feels that pssst! "...was the precursor of Escape and Deadline and the rest of the cascade of British adult comic mags that came out in the Eighties and Nineties." Critic Russell Willis, on the other hand, wrote of the publication, "It tended towards Heavy Metal tits, ass and girls-with-butterfly-wings style over any lasting substance."

Overview 
Early in his career, British comics expert Paul Gravett worked for pssst!; he described his experiences on his website:

Publication history 
Pssst! was produced by a division of Never Limited called Artpool Limited, owned by Serge Boissevain and Henriette Bentinck Boissevain. The company was based in London, at 38 Mount Pleasant in Clerkenwell. Psssst was distributed by Seymour Press Ltd. In late 1981, Paul Gravett left his role as manager of Fast Fiction — a stall at the bimonthly Westminster Comics Mart which sold bande dessinée — to work as promotions manager for pssst!. 

According to Talbot, each issue was about "fifty pages, printed on top quality glossy paper and with the highest production values."

Early parts of Talbot's The Adventures of Luther Arkwright were published in pssst! (the first parts having been published in the British underground comic Near Myths in 1978–1980). Talbot "reworked the chapters that [he'd] already done for Near Myths but by around issue five or six [he] was drawing new ones." 

Grant Morrison and Tony O'Donnell went to London for a meeting with pssst!'s publishers, who said they wanted to publish Morrison's Gideon Stargrave stories as well as some of their other work. Morrison said, "I'd done a new Gideon Stargrave story... it's my favourite one I've ever done in my life and it's never been seen anywhere." Pssst!, however, was canceled before it was published, leading Morrison to "feel that [he] was some kind of albatross".

Talbot's Arkwright storyline, less than half complete, was interrupted again when pssst! was canceled in 1982.

As Gravett writes, "Put together by committee, pssst! was a camel of a magazine, which was forced to close after ten issues.

Legacy 
In 1983, Gravett and Peter Stanbury formed Escape magazine, with a mandate similar to that of pssst!, and which lasted until the end of the 1980s.

As he shut down pssst!, publisher Serge Boissevain collected all of Talbot's Luther Arkwright stories — including the material from Near Myths — in the trade paperback (TPB) The Adventures of Luther Arkwright Book 1: Rat Trap. Thanks to Valkyrie Press, between 1987 and 1989 Talbot completed the story, which was published as a series of nine standard comic books. In 1987, Boissevain paid for the printing of the Valkyrie Press TPB, The Adventures of Luther Arkwright Book 2: Transfiguration. And then, in 1989, under the publisher name Proutt, Boissevain published the final Luther Arkwright TPB, Book 3: Götterdämmerung.

References

External links 
 

Comics anthologies
British small press comics
1982 establishments in the United Kingdom